Mohave Accelerated Learning Center (MALC) is a public charter school serving grades K-12 in Bullhead City, Arizona. The school opened in 2001.

References

External links
 Website
 ADE School Report Card
 Great Schools review

Charter schools in Arizona
Public middle schools in Arizona
Public high schools in Arizona